Huntington Beach City Elementary School District is a public school district based in Orange County, California, United States.

Schools
Middle schools:
Ethel R. Dwyer Middle School
Isaac L. Sowers Middle School

Elementary schools:
John H. Eader Elementary School
Dr. Ralph E. Hawes Elementary School
Huntington Seacliff Elementary School
S. A. Moffett Elementary School
Joseph R. Perry Elementary School
John R. Peterson Elementary School
Agnes L. Smith Elementary School

References

External links
 

School districts in Orange County, California
Education in Huntington Beach, California